Sheikh Abul Kalam Azad better known by his nickname Phool Babu is a high profile Nepalese politician, Social Worker and current Minister of State for Social Development in Madhesh Province.
He won second time in a row Member of the Legislative Assembly of Rautahat District Constituency 4(B) Pradesh Sabha. He is also former VDC chairman() of Gamhariya, Nepal.

Personal life and early career
Phool Babu was born into an affluent Muslim Sheikh family in Gamhariya, a village in Rautahat District, some 90 kilometres east of Nepal's financial capital Birgunj. 
His father, grand father and great grand father have very long history of ruling this area as Zamindar.

He started his political career from Nepali Congress party and won the local election from Nepali Congress at the time when Communist Party UML were making a clean sweep in Nepalese local elections, 1997
 and served as chairman of VDC Gamhariya thereafter.

The local representatives that were elected in 1997 had their five-year terms expired at the height of the brutal Maoist insurgency.

The 10-year war ended in 2006 and the country began a rocky transition from a Hindu monarchy to a secular federal republic, which has seen it cycle through nine governments.

The long gap between polls has left an institutional void at local level, which has seen graft become a way of life in Nepal, hampering the delivery of basic services as well as the recovery from a devastating 2015 earthquake.

During this transition period he served as De facto leader of this area.

Madhesh Andolan
The Madheshis and Tharus are non-Nepali speaking people forming 70% of Terai population residing in Terai(Madhesh/plain) region of Nepal who are culturally distinct from the hill people.

This is the 60 years old dissatisfaction of Madheshi and Tharu that Nepal does not considers them as a Nepali, Nepal considers Madhesh as internal colony.

The southern plains of Nepal – Terai belt should be an undivided federal state. This demand was revised such that there shall be two federal states in Terai. 
One from Jhapa to Chitwan called Madhesh and another from Chitwan to Kanchanpur called Tharuhat.

These people think the demarcation of seven federal provinces in the constitution to be unfair. Only a patch of eight districts in the region 
were given the status of state in Terai; while the remaining 14 districts were carved with the hill districts with the sole purpose of converting
the local people into minority. In doing so, the Madheshis and Tharus were sidelined in the entire constitution making process due to the distrust towards them.

Due to this dissatisfaction he left Pahadi biased Political party Nepali Congress and join Madhesh based Party.

Nepalese local elections, 2017
Just before Nepalese local elections, 2017 Gadhimai Municipality was formed by merging former 6 Village development committees Gamhariya, samanpur, Sangrampur, Bahuwa Madanpur, Dharampur and Bariyarpur.
In Nepalese local elections, 2017 he fought election for the Mayor from Gadhimai Municipality from Madhesh based Party ,Rastriya Janata Party Nepal but lost to Nepali Congress Shyam Yadav with very little margin.

Nepalese provincial elections, 2017
He has big influence on the public in Rautahat District and the people from his own and neighboring Municipality as well as Rautahat District giving him strong support to fight for Member of the Legislative Assembly in Nepalese provincial elections, 2017 and thus he was expecting for Ticket from Madhesh based Rastriya Janata Party Nepal but due to some political unfairness, it was denied.

As Public support was with him and he was confident that he will win Nepalese provincial elections, 2017. So, he registered for Member of the Legislative Assembly as an independent and won the election.

He serves as Member of the Legislative Assembly in Pradesh Sabha in Province No. 2, Nepal.

Province No. 2 Development Assembly, Nepal
He served as a President of Province No. 2 Development Assembly between 2017 and 2022.

Nepalese provincial elections, 2022
He got ticket from from People's Socialist Party, Nepal and won again Member of the Legislative Assembly election.

He serves as Member of the Legislative Assembly in Pradesh Sabha in Madhesh Province, Nepal.

Madhesh Province Cabinet, Nepal
He currently serves as a Minister of State for Social Development  in Madhesh Province, Nepal.

See also
Mohammad Lalbabu Raut
Upendra Yadav
Rajendra Mahato
Girija Prasad Koirala
Pushpa Kamal Dahal
Sher Bahadur Deuba
Khadga Prasad Oli

References

Living people
Members of the Nepalese Constituent Assembly
Nepalese politicians
Year of birth missing (living people)